The 1891 Penn Quakers football team represented the University of Pennsylvania in the 1891 college football season. The Quakers finished with an 11–2 record in their fourth year under head coach E. O. Wagenhorst. Significant games included victories over Rutgers (32–6), Lafayette (15–6 and 12–10), and Lehigh (42–0 and 32–0), and losses to Princeton (24–0) and undefeated national champion Yale (48–0).  The 1891 Penn team outscored its opponents by a combined total of 267 to 109. Penn center John Adams was selected by Caspar Whitney as a first-team player on the 1891 College Football All-America Team.

Schedule

References

Penn
Penn Quakers football seasons
Penn Quakers football